Hippie bus is a slang term and may refer to:

Any of a number of small long-distance bus companies that operated in the United States in the 1970s, including
Green Tortoise
Grey Rabbit

A Volkswagen Type 2, or VW bus

See also
Further (bus)